Daniel Silver (born 1972) is an artist living in London.

Life and career 

Silver was born in London and raised in Jerusalem. Silver studied at the Slade School of Art (BA Fine Art, 1999). He received his MA in Sculpture from the Royal College of Art, London in 2001. He went on to study sculpture in Italy at the British School at Rome in 2002. He has exhibited across the UK and internationally. Silver is represented by Frith Street Gallery London.

Work

Silver's work includes sculpture, painting, drawing and installation. His work draws from ancient sculptural archetypes and modernist sculptors, like Jacob Epstein and Henri Gaudier-Brzeska.
Despite its references to figurative sculptural traditions, the former director of the Museu Nacional de Belas Artes (Rio de Janeiro) Paulo Herkenhoff  described Daniel Silver’s sculpture as a “dyslexic body” which “refuses to follow a canon, or an established grammar which builds meanings, or work in pre-mapped territory”.

Silver explores and manipulates the sculptural figure in his work. As his practice has developed he has examined the physical and emotional impact of the body and its representation. He has said that he is particularly interested in the head as his subject. “The reason I make the head is, on the one hand to continue the bust-making tradition, and on the other that they are the most interesting part of the body, the most object-like part of the body.”

Exhibitions 

Silver's projects include Dig, a commission by producers, Artangel. This sculptural installation was located in Grafton Way, into a derelict site where once was located one of London's largest Odeon Cinemas.  Silver presented an imagined archeological dig of sculptures looking both ancient and futuristic, conceived by the artist as a “history of sculpture”. The project is inspired by Freud’s collection of antiques, which was used by Freud as a reservoir of metaphors to interpret his patients' traumatic experiences. Similarly, Silver is interested in the psychological and emotional dimension of sculpture and to investigate its relation with memory and history. In an interview with Ben Luke, Silver explained that "To be an archaeologist is about understanding our past through objects. I’m also trying to figure out things that are more psychological, about us as people, and objects throughout time allow me to do that.”

Selected exhibitions

Awards 

Silver is a recipient of the Henry Moore Artist in Residency (2005), Rome Scholar in Fine Arts, The British School at Rome (2002), Credit Suisse First Boston Award, US (2001) and the Sharett Scholarship, America Israel Cultural Foundation, New York, US (2000).

Selected bibliography

 Daniel Silver: Dig. Published by Artangel (2013) 
 Daniel Silver. Published by Art Editions North (2007)

Footnotes

External links 

In Conversation with Daniel Silver - Acne Studios
Acne Studios creates very yellow interior for West Hollywood store - Dezeen
Daniel Silver Interview - The New Art Gallery Walsall
Daniel Silver - Frith Street Gallery
Images, text and biography from the Saatchi Gallery
Daniel Silver on Artfacts.net
Daniel Silver on art fashion at ACNE collection launch. Blogs.wsj.com

1972 births
Living people
British sculptors
British male sculptors
Israeli contemporary artists
British contemporary artists